Gopalapuram mandal is one of the 19 mandals in East Godavari district of the Indian state of Andhra Pradesh. It is administered under Kovvur revenue division and its headquarters are located at Gopalapuram. The mandal is bounded by Polavaram, Koyyalagudem, Devarapalle and Tallapudi mandals.

Towns and villages 

 census, the mandal has 18 settlements. Gopalapuram is the most populated and Saggonda is the least populated village in the mandal.

The settlements in the mandal are listed below:

See also 
East Godavari district

References

Mandals in East Godavari district